Mulgrew is a name of Irish origin, which is an anglicization of the Gaelic name O'Maolchraoibhe. Mulgrew is used as a surname or given name, and may refer to:

List of people with the given name 

 Mulgrew Miller (1955–2013), American jazz pianist

List of people with the surname 
Charlie Mulgrew (born 1986), Scottish football player
Jamie Mulgrew (born 1986), Northern Irish football player
Kate Mulgrew (born 1955), American actress
Kevin Mulgrew (born 1947), New Zealand football player
Michael Mulgrew (born 1965), American labor leader
Nick Mulgrew (born 1990), South African writer
Peter Mulgrew (1927–1979), New Zealand mountaineer
Timi Mulgrew (born 1992), American soccer player
Tommy Mulgrew (born 1929), Scottish football player

Fictional characters 

 Christine Mulgrew, from the BBC TV Drama Waterloo Road

Surnames of Irish origin
Anglicised Irish-language surnames
English-language surnames
Surnames of British Isles origin